David Lynch Scott (21 August 1845 – 26 July 1924) was a Canadian militia officer, lawyer, and judge. He served as mayor of Orangeville, Ontario, mayor of Regina, Saskatchewan and Chief Justice of Alberta.

Early life
He was born in Brampton, Ontario, the son of John Scott and Mary Lynch. He studied law at Osgoode Hall, was called to the Ontario bar in 1870 and practised in Brampton and Orangeville. In 1882, he moved to Regina, Saskatchewan.

Marriage
He married Mary McVittie on November 19, 1883 in Barrie, Ontario.

Career
He enlisted as a private in the 36th (Peel) Battalion of Infantry during the Fenian invasions of 1866. By the end of his military service in 1879, he had attained the rank of lieutenant-colonel.

Scott was mayor of Orangeville from 1879–1880, and in 1884-85 served as the first Mayor of Regina. Scott first rose to prominence as a lawyer when he acted as the junior counsel for the crown in the prosecutions of Louis Riel, Big Bear, Poundmaker and those involved in the Frog Lake Massacre following the North-West Rebellion of 1885.

He was named Queen's Counsel in 1885 and was the first person admitted as an advocate of the Northwest Territories. Scott became a justice of the newly formed Supreme Court of the Northwest Territories in 1894, seated in Calgary, Alberta. In 1907 he became a member of the Supreme Court of the new province of Alberta, seated in Edmonton.

When Chief Justice of Alberta Arthur Sifton resigned to become Premier, Scott thought he would be his replacement. However, Horace Harvey received the appointment. This frustrated Scott to the extent that he went from being an extremely active member of the bench, to a virtually non-existent member for the next decade. However, on 15 September 1921, he became the Chief Justice of Alberta and presided over the Supreme Court of Alberta Appellate Division. This reignited the feud with Harvey who had occupied the position of Chief Justice of Alberta since 1910. The feud was resolved in Scott's favour by the Judicial Committee of the Privy Council in Reference re Chief Justice of Alberta.

Later life
Scott was awarded an honorary Doctor of Laws from the University of Alberta in 1924.

Death
He died in Cooking Lake, Alberta, where he had a summer cottage, at the age of 78 in 1924. He was interred in Edmonton.

References

1845 births
1924 deaths
Lawyers in Alberta
Judges in Alberta
Mayors of places in Ontario
Mayors of Regina, Saskatchewan
People from Brampton
19th-century King's Counsel
20th-century King's Counsel
Pre-Confederation Saskatchewan people
Judges in the Northwest Territories
Canadian King's Counsel